Staying Alive: A Writer's Guide is a book by Norman Spinrad published in 1983.

Contents
Staying Alive: A Writer's Guide is a book which details the workings of the publication industry.

Reception
Dave Langford reviewed Staying Alive: A Writer's Guide for White Dwarf #46, and stated that "even as he denounces the hideous effects of corporate politics and accountancy on SF publishing, he plainly relishes and can't stop using the soulless jargon of Big Money and Big Hype with all its horrid incantatory value Illuminating, but a pain to read."

Reviews
Review by Christopher Priest (1983) in Foundation, #29 November 1983

References

1983 books